An operator A on an (infinite dimensional) Banach space or Hilbert space H has a cyclic vector f if the vectors f, Af, A2f,... span H. Equivalently, f is a cyclic vector for A in case the set of all vectors of the form p(A)f, where p varies over all polynomials, is dense in H.

See also
 Cyclic and separating vector

References

Abstract algebra
Functional analysis